Montignoso is a comune (municipality) in the Province of Massa and Carrara in the Italian region Tuscany, located about  northwest of Florence and about  southeast of Massa.

Montignoso borders the following municipalities: Forte dei Marmi, Massa, Pietrasanta, Seravezza.

References

External links

 Official website

Cities and towns in Tuscany